AKIpress News Agency is the first independent news agency in the Kyrgyz Republic. It is based in Bishkek, the capital city of the Kyrgyz
Republic. The agency is commercially focused: AKIpress earns money from paid access to archives  and from the sale of advertising space on its websites. The online news website is in Russian, Kyrgyz and English. The agency's websites publish daily between 500 and 700 news stories about the latest developments in Kyrgyzstan, including political, economic, social, scientific, cultural, diplomatic and sports news. Working mode is 24 hours a day.

History
The domain was registered on 19 June 2000. The site of the first ever independent news agency AKIpress began functioning after a testing period.

In 2002, the agency opened the first independent press center in the Kyrgyz Republic.

AKIpress news agency marked its 10th anniversary in 2010

Products
Over the years, the news agency has developed 25 products in total, from news and analytical products to who is who among statesmen and companies, video portal, entertainment and classifieds.

Currently, AKIpress has a number of subsidiary information sites, including the economic edition Tazabek, the regional news portal Turmush, the news site "Reporter", the criminal news site "Svodka", as well as "Sport AKIpress", "Culture", "Healthcare", etc. The agency has a full English version - AKIpress news agency (English).

In 2007, with the participation of AKIpress, the Central Asian news service CentralAsia.media was established to cover news from the countries of the Central Asian region.

AKIpress also supports the youth entertainment website Limon.kg and video service BulBul.kg.

Audience

In the autumn of 2016, the number of unique users exceeded 2 million per month for the first time, according to Google Analytics data. The following year, AKIpress saw significant growth in its audience again. According to Google Analytics, over 27 million unique users visited AKIpress websites in 2020 and the total number of page views exceeded 436 million.
Over 38 million unique users visited AKIpress websites in 2022 and the total number of page views exceeded 237 million.
At the same time, the daily audience on weekdays is at least 300,000 people.

Social networks

AKIpress news may be followed in popular social networking sites like Facebook, Twitter, Instagram.

As of January 1, 2023, the number of Facebook followers of AKIpress reached 149,000.

AKIpress channel in Telegram (t.me/akipress) has around 33,000 followers. 

AKIpress channel on TikTok is followed by 76,000. 

AKIpress account on Twitter has more than 7,000 followers. 

AKIpress has the largest audience in social networks in Instagram (instagram.com/akipress) - as of January 1, 2023 there are 894 thousand followers. The most popular AKIpress posts were viewed more than 700,000 times.

Management

Alina Saginbayeva is the Director General of AKIpress News Agency.

References

External links
 Official site of AKIpress in Russian
 Official site of AKIpress in English
 Tazabek / Business AKIpress
 Barakelde in Kyrgyz

News agencies based in Kyrgyzstan